Popstars is an international reality television franchise aimed to find new singing talent. Serving as a precursor to the Idol franchise, Popstars first began in New Zealand in 1999 when producer Jonathan Dowling formed the girl group TrueBliss. Despite all shows in the Popstars franchise having been off air in recent years, it remains one of the most successful TV show formats of all time with the format being sold to more than 50 countries, and producing groups such as Girls Aloud that had success on the UK charts for the next ten years after winning. The show was the inspiration for Simon Fuller's Idols franchise.

History

The series originated in New Zealand, broadcast on TV2 in 1999, where producer Jonathan Dowling formed the five member all-girl group TrueBliss. Dowling then licensed the concept to production company Screentime in Australia, who then on sold it to TresorTV in Germany before taking it worldwide.  Despite all versions now being cancelled, Popstars remains very successful, with the format being sold to over 50 countries.

The show was the inspiration for Simon Fuller's Pop Idol franchise which would dominate reality TV, (along with Big Brother and Survivor) for the next few years.

Although Popstars started successfully in most countries during the early 2000s, the shows gradually began to fail and were dropped by many broadcasters due to poor ratings. The last country where Popstars was still popular and successful – besides other casting shows such as The X Factor and Got Talent, as well as Idol – was Germany. This is where ProSieben produced the ninth season in 2010 because of the show's massive success in the ratings, but in 2012, Popstars was finally cancelled due to the short success of the groups formed throughout the episodes. In 2007, the show returned to France on M6 for one season. A  new version of Popstars started in 2008 in the Netherlands and ran for three seasons. Germany's version returned for an eleventh season in 2015, but would later get cancelled following poor ratings. In 2021, a revamped version of the original New Zealand series returned to TVNZ. The new series focuses on individual artists and songwriting development and does not involve putting together a pop group.

Popstars around the world

Legend:
 Franchise has ceased production  
 Franchise awaiting debut or renewal

Number one singles
The following is a list of singles that reached #1 in the respective nations of the Popstars artists

References

External links

Official Popstars (Germany)
Popstars (Australia) at the National Film and Sound Archive

 
Reality television series franchises
Singing talent shows
Banijay franchises